Varberg  is a locality and the seat of Varberg Municipality, Halland County, Sweden, with 35,782 inhabitants in 2019.

Varberg and all of Halland are well known for their "typical west coast" sandy beaches.  In Varberg the coast changes from wide sandy beaches to rocky terrain that continues north into the Bohuslän archipelago and as far as the North Cape.

Geography 
Varberg is located along the Swedish west coast and is a popular beach and surfing destination in both Sweden and Europe. It has a main landmark in the large Fortress and Castle of Varberg, through centuries many wars between Denmark and Sweden was fought here before Southern Sweden, including Varberg became permanently Swedish in 1658 through the Treaty of Roskilde. It is a small town with architecture mainly from the turn of the century and have several green parks such as the Society Park (Societetsparken) and the English Park. The green parks was however not always there, in fact in the 19th century the town was largely without trees and green areas, in its place was bald rocks and sand. The Swedish authoritative author and bishop Esaias Tegnér described it in 1826 as the least appealing place in Sweden, which has later been used in the marketing of Varberg. Today this have changed and its sandy beaches is a popular destination. Another main factor in Varberg is its natural surroundings. The landscape further inland has rolling hills with lakes and forests in contrast to the flatter coastal areas.

Climate 
Varberg has an oceanic climate that although moderate by Swedish standards, still retains quite large seasonal variation. Summers are in general cooler than both in Halmstad and Gothenburg, with highs being moderated by the marine airflow. Although this moderation occurs, some summer days can be very warm, and some winter nights see severe frosts. The highest recorded temperature since 1901 is 33.6°C (92.5°F) on July 31, 2018 and the lowest is -25.5°C (-13.9°F) in January 1942.

History 

A fortress called Varberg (at that time written Wardbergh, "watch hill") was erected in the 1280s as part of a chain of military establishments along the coast, in what was then Danish territory. The town was moved  northwards around the year 1400. It was destroyed during the Kalmar War (1611-1612) and rebuilt near the fortress. In 1645 Halland passed from Denmark to Sweden by the Treaty of Brömsebro for a period of 30 years. It had at that time about 600 inhabitants. The transfer was made permanent by the Treaty of Roskilde in 1658. The town was moved again after a fire in 1666 to where the city centre is located today. The city was devastated by a huge fire in 1863 and was subsequently rebuilt with stone or brick houses. In 1890 the population figure had passed 4,000 and with industrialization it reached 8,500 in 1930. The local government reform of 1971 made Varberg the seat of the much larger Varberg Municipality, with a current population of close to 56,000 inhabitants. Although several houses were torn down in the 1970s, most of the city center still remains intact.

Sights 
 
Varberg's fortress is its most notable historical building, mostly because of its size as it has no architectural uniformity. It was first built as a castle in 1280, with new parts being built in successions.

Near Varberg there is the VLF transmitter Grimeton, an interesting radio-technical facility and classified by UNESCO to be a World Cultural Heritage site. It can be visited during the summer. Bexell Cottage is also located in the area.

Sports
The following sports clubs are located in Varberg:

 Varbergs BoIS FC
 Varbergs GIF FK
 Lilla Träslövs FF
 Varberg Vipers

Transportation
Varberg Airport, ICAO code ESGV, is located northwest of the town of 
Varberg.

European cooperation
 Varberg is a member city of Eurotowns network

Notable people

Sophie Gustafson, golfer
Kamchatka, hard rock band
Sven Nylander, 400m hurdler 
Mathilda Ranch, early Varberg photographer
Stefan Selaković, footballer
Margareta Svensson, singer, performer, television personality
Dafina Zeqiri, singer
Niclas Eliasson, footballer
Andy LaRocque, guitarist, songwriter, producer
Ingemund Bengtsson, social democratic politician and Speaker of the Riksdag
Otto Torell, Swedish naturalist and geologist
Dick Lövgren, bass guitarist for Swedish extreme metal band Meshuggah

References 
Some material from :sv:Varberg
Cyber City
 article Varberg from Nordisk familjebok

External links 

Varberg Municipality - Official site
Halland County Museum at Varberg - Official site

 
Populated places in Halland County
Populated places in Varberg Municipality
Municipal seats of Halland County
Swedish municipal seats
Coastal cities and towns in Sweden
Cities in Halland County